The 1999–2000 season was Colchester United's 58th season in their history and their second successive season in the third tier of English football, the Second Division. Alongside competing in the Second Division, the club also participated in the FA Cup, the League Cup and the Football League Trophy.

Following of a rocky first season back in the third tier, Colchester had an equally unharmonious beginning to the 1999–2000 season, with managing director Steve Gage resigning, shortly followed by manager Mick Wadsworth. Former player, caretaker manager and assistant manager Steve Whitton was appointed Wadsworth's replacement. It was a season of much change but little progress, as the U's stuttered to another 18th-placed finish, despite a strong start to the new Millennium.

Colchester suffered first round exits once more in all three cup competitions after Crystal Palace beat the U's 5–3 over two legs in the League Cup, and Swansea City dumped them out of the FA Cup and Football League Trophy.

Season overview
Mick Wadsworth made swingeing cuts to the playing staff in the close season as nine first-team regulars were allowed to leave, including fan favourites Joe Dunne and Tony Adcock, who fell just four goals short of Martyn King's club record of 131 career league goals.

Despite the numerous changes, all was not well behind the scenes at Colchester United. Managing director Steven Gage resigned on the eve of the new season, and within two weeks of the season starting, Wadsworth had also resigned to join Crystal Palace. Wadsworth had brought in a number of highly paid players, most of whom were linked to controversial football agent Barry Silkman. When Brian Launders was sacked by the club for gross misconduct, Silkman took Colchester United to court, exposing the influence agents had on the game and confirming Steve Wignall statements regarding agents following his resignation the season prior. As a result, U's chairman Peter Heard invoked a policy of no longer dealing with agents.

Steve Whitton was appointed Wadsworth's replacement after serving as caretaker manager and having been Wadsworth's assistant. By October, the Colchester were bottom of the league following a dismal run of one win in eleven games, including a 5–2 defeat by Cambridge United. Whitton reinstated ostracised players such as Tony Lock and Richard Wilkins and re-signed Joe Dunne and Steve McGavin. He led the U's to safety with an 18th position finish, as Steve McGavin registered 16 goals for himself, while Lomana LuaLua emerged as a future star with 14 goals to his name.

In the cup competitions, Colchester exited all three at the first round stage. Swansea City defeated the U's in the FA Cup and Football League Trophy, while Wadsworth's then-future club Crystal Palace saw off Colchester 5–3 on aggregate in the League Cup.

Players

Transfers

In

 Total spending:  ~ £0

Out

 Total incoming:  ~ £30,000

Loans in

Loans out

Match details

Second Division

Results round by round

League table

Matches

Football League Cup

FA Cup

Football League Trophy

Squad statistics

Appearances and goals

|-
!colspan="16"|Players who appeared for Colchester who left during the season

|}

Goalscorers

Disciplinary record

Clean sheets
Number of games goalkeepers kept a clean sheet.

Player debuts
Players making their first-team Colchester United debut in a fully competitive match.

See also
List of Colchester United F.C. seasons

References

General
Books

Websites

Specific

1999-2000
1999–2000 Football League Second Division by team